The 1969 South American Artistic Gymnastics Championships were held in Porto Alegre, Brazil, October 9–12, 1969. This was the second edition of the South American Artistic Gymnastics Championships, and for the first time women's events were also competed.

Participating nations

Medalists

References

1969 in gymnastics
South American Gymnastics Championships
International gymnastics competitions hosted by Brazil
1969 in Brazilian sport
October 1969 sports events in South America